Elizabeth Norton (born June 13, 1957) is a former professional tennis player from the United States.

A right-handed player from Connecticut, Norton was a national junior hardcourt champion and leading junior in the world, before competing professionally in the 1970s and 1980s. She reached a career high ranking of No. 20 in the world.

Norton featured in all four grand slam tournaments during her career. A two-time Australian Open doubles quarter-finalist, her best performance in singles came at the 1976 US Open, where she won through to the round of 16. She was Steffi Graf's doubles partner on the West German's Wimbledon debut in 1984.

As a child, she played a team sport called hocker, which her father invented so that the whole family could play a sport together.

References

External links
 
 

1957 births
Living people
American female tennis players
Tennis people from Connecticut
21st-century American women